Louis Van De Goor (born 25 December 1915, date of death unknown) was a Belgian basketball player. He competed in the men's tournament at the 1948 Summer Olympics.

References

1915 births
Year of death missing
Belgian men's basketball players
Olympic basketball players of Belgium
Basketball players at the 1948 Summer Olympics
Sportspeople from Brussels